The Washington Huskies are the intercollegiate athletic teams that represent the University of Washington, located in Seattle. The school competes at the National Collegiate Athletic Association (NCAA) Division I level as a member of the Pac-12 Conference.

Washington students, sports teams, and alumni are called Huskies. The husky was selected as the school mascot by the Associated Students of UW in 1922. It replaced the "Sun Dodger," an abstract reference to the local weather that was quickly dropped in favor of something more tangible. The costumed "Harry the Husky" performs at sporting and special events, and a live Alaskan Malamute, currently named Dubs II, traditionally leads the football team onto the field at the start of games. The school colors of purple and gold were adopted in 1892 by student vote. The choice was purportedly inspired by the first stanza of Lord Byron's The Destruction of Sennacherib

On-campus facilities include Husky Stadium (football), Hec Edmundson Pavilion (basketball, gymnastics and volleyball), Husky Ballpark (baseball), Husky Softball Stadium (softball), the Nordstrom Tennis Center, the Dempsey Indoor practice facility, and the Conibear Shellhouse (rowing). Recently added was the Husky Track located just north of the Husky Ballpark. The golf team's home course is at the Washington National Golf Club in Auburn. "Montlake" is used as a metonym for the athletic department and its teams., with most on-campus facilities located north of the Montlake Cut and on or near Montlake Boulevard in Seattle.

Sports sponsored

The University of Washington sponsors teams in nine men's and twelve women's NCAA-sanctioned sports, plus men's rowing, primarily competing in the Pac-12 Conference, with men's rowing in the Intercollegiate Rowing Association and both track and field programs in the Mountain Pacific Sports Federation.

Football

The university football team's first game was in 1889.

From 1907 to 1917, Washington football teams were unbeaten in 64 consecutive games, an NCAA Division I-A record. During this period, Washington won 40 games in a row under coach Gil Dobie, currently the second longest winning streak in NCAA Division I-A history. In 1916, Dobie finished his remarkable coaching career at Washington with an undefeated 58–0–3 record.

The 1925 team posted an undefeated record but lost to Alabama 21–20 in the Rose Bowl. The 1960 team finished 10–1, under coach Jim Owens, and won its second consecutive Rose Bowl by defeating national champion Minnesota 17–7 (the national champion was declared before the bowl games in 1960). Coach Owens served from 1957 to 1974. Don James became head coach in 1975 and transformed the team into a national power while compiling a 153–57–2 record. James' first successful year was in 1977 with the team quarterbacked by Warren Moon culminating in a 27–20 victory over Michigan in the Rose Bowl. Washington and Michigan played again in the 1981 Rose Bowl, a 23–6 loss. The next year, the Huskies returned to the Rose Bowl and defeated Iowa 28–0, the last Rose Bowl shutout and the only shutout in the past half century. Following a two-year hiatus during which cross-state rival WSU prevented the Huskies from Rose Bowl appearances by defeating them in the last game of the 1982 and 1983 seasons, in 1984 Washington posted an 11–1 record and beat Oklahoma 28–17 to win the Orange Bowl. Senior running back, Jacque Robinson won the MVP award and was the first player to win MVP awards for both the Orange and Rose Bowls.

The 1991 team is considered to be the best Washington Husky football team and among the best in college football history. The team went undefeated, winning against opponents by an average score of 42–9 in regular season, including wins over No. 9 Nebraska, No. 7 California and a 34–14 win over No. 4 Michigan in the Rose Bowl. In 2000, Washington finished with an 11–1 record, and won its seventh Rose Bowl under the leadership of Marques Tuiasosopo.

Washington officially claims two national championships in football: 1960 and 1991. Washington was selected in 1960 by the Helms Athletic Foundation and in 1991 by the Coaches Poll and other selectors.

National Championships (2)
1960, 1991
Pac-12 titles (17)
1916, 1919, 1925, 1936, 1959 (tie), 1960, 1963, 1977, 1980, 1981, 1990, 1991, 1992 (tie), 1995 (tie), 2000 (tie), 2016, 2018
Bowl history
18 wins, 17 losses, 1 tie

Men's basketball

NCAA Championships
National Champion: (None)
Final Four: 1953
Sweet 16: 1984, 1998, 2005, 2006, 2010
Pac-12 Regular Season Titles (12)
1931, 1934, 1943, 1944 (tie), 1948, 1951, 1953, 1984 (tie), 1985 (tie), 2009, 2012, 2019
Pac-12 Tournament Championships (3)
2005, 2010, 2011

Women's basketball

NCAA Championships
National Champion: (None)
Final Four: 2016
Elite Eight: 1990, 2001, 2016
Sweet 16: 1988, 1991, 1995, 2001, 2016, 2017
NWBL (Coast Division) Regular Season Titles (1)
1978
NorPac Regular Season Titles (2)
1985, 1986
Pac-10 Regular Season Titles (3)
1988, 1990(t), 2001(t)
NorPac Tournament Championships (1)
1985

Softball

NCAA Championships (1)
Championships: (2009)
Title games: 1996, 1999, 2009, 2018
Pac-12 Championships (4)
1996, 2000, 2010, 2019

Baseball

Pacific Coast Conference Championships (2)
1919, 1922

Pacific Coast Conference North Division Championships (8)
1923, 1925, 1926, 1929, 1930, 1932, 1952, 1959

Pac-10 North (6)
1981, 1992, 1993, 1996, 1997, 1998

Pac-12 Championships (2)
1997, 1998

Women's cross country

NCAA Championships (1) 
2008

NCAA West Region Championships (5)
1989, 1992, 2008, 2009, 2010, 2011

Pac-12 Championships (2) 
2008, 2009

Men's cross country

Pac-12 Championships (1)
1993

West Regional Champions (1)
2015

8th NCAA National Championships
2015

Men's soccer

Pac-12 Championships (13)
 1968, 1972, 1973, 1976, 1982, 1983, 1985, 1987, 1992, 1998, 1999, 2000, 2013, 2019, 2020

Men's tennis

Pac-12 Championships (39) 
1938, 1939, 1941, 1942, 1943, 1946, 1947, 1948, 1949, 1950, 1951, 1952, 1953, 1954, 1955, 1956, 1957, 1977, 1978, 1979, 1980, 1981, 1982, 1983, 1984, 1985, 1986, 1987, 1988, 1989, 1990, 1991, 1992, 1993, 1994, 1995, 1996, 1997, 2005

Swimming

The University of Washington had a swimming team. It was disbanded in 2009 due to lack of funding.

Women's tennis

Pac-12 Championships
1987, 1988, 1989, 1990, 1991, 1992, 1993, 1994, 1995, 1996, 1997

Volleyball

NCAA Championships (1)
 2005

Pac-12 Championships
1980, 2004, 2005, 2013, 2015, 2016

Rowing
The University of Washington rowing is a longstanding tradition at the UW dating back to 1899. The Washington men's crew won the gold medal at the 1936 Summer Olympics in Berlin, defeating the German and Italian crews.

The crew's traditional rival has been the other West Coast powerhouse, the University of California Golden Bears.

Women's NWRA Open Championships
Varsity Eight: top college finisher – 1971 (2nd overall), 1972 (4th overall)
Novice Eight: 1979
Varsity Four: 1979
Lightweight Eight: 1971, 1972, 1973
Lightweight Four: 1969, 1970, 1973

Women's Collegiate National Champions (NWRA/USRowing) held 1980–1996
Varsity Eight: 1981, 1982, 1983, 1984, 1985, 1987, 1988
Junior Varsity Eight: 1981, 1982, 1983, 1987, 1989, 1994
Varsity Four: 1980
Lightweight Eight: 1980, 1987
Lightweight Four: 1980

Women's NCAA Championships (1997, 1998, 2001, 2017, 2019)
Varsity Eight: 1997, 1998, 2001, 2002, 2017, 2019
Junior Varsity Eight: 2002, 2017, 2019, 2021
Varsity Four: 1999, 2000, 2001, 2008, 2017, 2019, 2021

Women's Pac-12 Championships
Varsity Eight: 1977, 1980, 1981, 1982, 1983, 1984, 1985, 1986, 1987, 1988, 1989, 1990, 1992, 1993, 1994, 1995, 1996, 1997, 1998, 1999, 2000, 2001, 2002, 2017, 2018, 2021
Junior Varsity Eight: 1982, 1983, 1984, 1985, 1986, 1987, 1988, 1989, 1992, 1993, 1994, 1997, 1998, 1999, 2000, 2001, 2002, 2014, 2017, 2018, 2019, 2021
Novice Eight: 1978, 1979, 1980, 1982, 1983, 1985, 1986, 1987, 1990, 1991, 1992, 1993, 1995, 1996, 1997, 1998, 1999, 2000, 2005, 2009, 2010, 2013, 2014, 2017, 2018, 2019, 2021
Varsity 4: 1977, 1979, 1981, 1983, 1985, 1986, 1987, 1988, 1992, 1994, 1995, 1999, 2000, 2004, 2007, 2008, 2010, 2017, 2018, 2019

Men's IRA Championships
Varsity Eight: 1923, 1924, 1926, 1936, 1937, 1940, 1941, 1948, 1950, 1970, 1997, 2007, 2009, 2011, 2012, 2013, 2014, 2015, 2021
Junior Varsity Eight: 1925, 1926, 1927, 1935, 1936, 1937, 1938, 1940, 1948, 1949, 1950, 1953, 1956, 1964, 1972, 1993, 1995, 1997, 2004, 2005, 2007, 2008, 2009, 2010, 2011, 2012, 2013, 2015, 2017, 2018, 2021
Freshman Eight/Third Varsity Eight: 1931, 1934, 1935, 1936, 1937, 1939, 1947, 1948, 1949, 1950, 1951, 1953, 1961, 1969, 1997, 2001, 2002, 2006, 2009, 2011, 2012, 2013, 2014, 2015, 2016, 2017, 2018, 2019, 2021

Men's National Collegiate Rowing Championship held 1982–1996
Varsity Eight: 1984

Men's unofficial national championships
Varsity Eight: 1933, 1977, 1978, 1981

Men's Pac-12 Championships
Varsity Eight: 1962, 1963, 1965, 1966, 1968, 1969, 1971, 1972, 1973, 1974, 1975, 1976, 1977, 1978, 1979, 1980, 1981, 1983, 1984, 1985, 1990, 1991, 1992, 1993, 1994, 1995, 1996, 1997, 2003, 2004, 2007, 2008, 2011, 2012, 2013, 2014, 2015, 2017, 2018, 2019, 2021
Junior Varsity Eight: 1962, 1963, 1964, 1965, 1966, 1970, 1971, 1973, 1974, 1975, 1978, 1979, 1984, 1985, 1986, 1988, 1989, 1992, 1993, 1994, 1995, 1996, 1997, 2004, 2005, 2007, 2008, 2009, 2010, 2011, 2012, 2013, 2015, 2017, 2018, 2019, 2021
Third Varsity Eight: 2015, 2016, 2017, 2018, 2019, 2021
Freshman Eight: 1961, 1965, 1968, 1969, 1970, 1971, 1972, 1973, 1974, 1976, 1977, 1978, 1979, 1984, 1985, 1986, 1988, 1990, 1992, 1994, 1997, 2001, 2002, 2008, 2009, 2010, 2012, 2013, 2014, 2015, 2019, 2021
Varsity 4: 1978, 1979, 1989, 1990, 1992, 1993, 1995, 1996, 1997, 1998, 1999, 2000, 2004, 2005, 2009, 2010, 2011, 2012, 2014, 2015, 2017, 2018, 2019, 2021

Men's golf
The men's golf team has won seven Pac-12 Conference championships: 1961, 1963, 1988, 2005, 2009, 2010, 2022. James Lepp won the NCAA (individual) Championship in 2005.

Women's golf
The women's golf team won their first NCAA national championship in 2016 by beating Stanford 3–2. In 1961 Judy Hoetmer won the women's national intercollegiate individual golf championship (an event conducted by the Division of Girls' and Women's Sports through 1981, the first year of the rival NCAA women's golf championship).

Notable non-varsity sports

Boxing
Both the men's and women's boxing teams compete in the National Collegiate Boxing Association. The Huskies won the very first NCBA national women's championship in 2014, and won again in 2015 and 2016.

Rugby
Founded in 1963, the University of Washington Husky Rugby Club plays college rugby in Division 1 in the Northwest Collegiate Rugby Conference against local rivals such as Washington State and Oregon. The Huskies won the Northwest championship in 1996, 2002, 2004 and 2005 and the D1AA Varsity Cup in 2014. 
The Huskies are led by head coach Brian Schoener, who formerly played for the U.S. national rugby team, by former U.S. national team player Kevin Swiryn, and by Director of Rugby Mike Alfstad. The Huskies rugby team is partially funded by an endowment from the alumni association.

Lacrosse
The University of Washington Husky Lacrosse Club plays college lacrosse in the Division 1 of the Men's Collegiate Lacrosse Association (MCLA) against local rivals such as Washington State, Oregon, Oregon St. and Western Washington. The Huskies have made the Pacific Northwest Collegiate Lacrosse League (PNCLL) playoffs 5 of the last 6 years. The Lacrosse team plays their home games on the IMA fields, and are regularly attended and popular amongst UW students; especially when in-state rival, Washington St. comes into town. The Husky's Lacrosse team is funded by annual dues paid by the players, as well as assistance from the IMA, and fundraisers.

Nickname and mascot

In the university's early history, Washington athletic teams were unnamed. Local sportswriters dubbed the varsity teams the "Vikings", "Indians", "Cougars", and other names in their headlines.

Sun Dodgers

On January 28, 1920, the Associated Students of the University of Washington (ASUW) chose the Sun Dodgers as the official nickname of varsity athletic teams at the university. The name ranked first from a list of names submitted to the 3,233 voters.

The Sun Dodgers nickname was suggested by students and sportswriters in November 1919 before coming up for the vote. The name was derived from Sun Dodger, a campus humor magazine published by the students, and as a tongue-in-cheek allusion to the city of Seattle's rainy weather.

The Sun Dodgers were represented by the mascot Sunny Boy, a 3.5 foot gold-painted wooden statue of a Washington undergraduate standing in front of the university's four columns. After being stolen from a fraternity trophy room and missing for decades, Sunny Boy was rediscovered in South Bend and returned to the Huskies prior to the 1948 game versus Notre Dame.

Seattle newspapers ran joint editorials on December 25, 1921, calling for the retirement of "Sun Dodgers" and proposing "Vikings" as a new nickname for Washington's athletic teams.
The Seattle Post-Intelligencer wrote that Sun Dodgers "lacks punch" and that "nobody knows what it means, anyway." The new name was said to be supported by head football coach Enoch Bagshaw and professor Edmond S. Meany, among other coaches, athletes, and administrators. The newspapers immediately began using "Vikings" in their headlines.

Upon returning to campus following Christmas vacation, students were surprised to learn that their teams had been renamed without consultation. "Vikings" was quickly abandoned. With "Sun Dodgers" having been found unsuitable, a joint committee of students, coaches, faculty, alumni, and businessmen was assembled in order to choose a permanent name for the university's athletic teams.

Huskies

UW teams were first introduced as the Huskies on February 3, 1922, during the halftime intermission of a basketball game vs. Washington State. The newly christened Huskies beat the Cougars, who adopted their nickname in 1919, by a score of 40–10.

The "Husky" nickname was the selection of the committee formed to replace "Sun Dodger". Other suggested names considered by the committee were "Wolves", "Malamutes", "Tyees", "Vikings", "Northmen", and "Olympics".

The Husky was likely chosen due to its relative ease to draw, short name for use in newspapers at the time, and it represented the ferocity of the athletic program. The ASUW felt that The Husky was a true representation of the Seattle area because many viewed Seattle as the "Gateway to the Alaskan frontier", a phrase dating back to the Alaskan Gold Rush.

Live mascot

Dubs (first of his name) became the Husky mascot in 2009. He is an Alaskan Malamute from Burlington, Washington and was born in November 2008. Following tradition, an online vote was conducted at GoHuskies.com for the name. With more than 20,000 votes cast, "Dubs II" was chosen.

Dubs II was officially unveiled as Dubs' successor on March 23, 2018 (National Puppy Day). He had been selected from a group of 90 puppies to become the 14th live mascot for the University of Washington. Dubs continued to fill in as mascot during the 2018 season, with his final performance leading the team out of the tunnel during Senior Day 2018 (though he later reappeared in a home game against the Oregon Ducks in 2019). Dubs II took over at halftime leading the football team out against the Oregon State Beavers.

Dubs II is present before every home Husky football game.

References

External links

 

 
College sports in Washington (state)